The FIL World Luge Championships, part of the International Luge Federation (FIL) have taken place on an almost annual basis in non-Winter Olympics years since 1955. These championships are shown for artificial tracks. See FIL World Luge Natural Track Championships for all natural track events that have taken place since 1979.

Host cities
1955: Oslo, Norway
1956: Event cancelled
1957: Davos, Switzerland
1958: Krynica, Poland
1959: Villard-de-Lans, France
1960: Garmisch-Partenkirchen, West Germany
1961: Girenbad, Switzerland
1962: Krynica, Poland
1963: Imst, Austria
1965: Davos, Switzerland
1966: Friedrichroda, East Germany (cancelled)
1967: Hammarstrand, Sweden
1969: Königssee, West Germany
1970: Königssee, West Germany
1971: Olang, Italy
1973: Oberhof, East Germany
1974: Königssee, West Germany
1975: Hammarstrand, Sweden
1977: Innsbruck, Austria
1978: Imst, Austria
1979: Königssee, West Germany
1981: Hammarstrand, Sweden
1983: Lake Placid, United States
1985: Oberhof, East Germany
1987: Innsbruck, Austria
1989: Winterberg, West Germany
1990: Calgary, Canada
1991: Winterberg, Germany
1993: Calgary, Canada
1995: Lillehammer, Norway
1996: Altenberg, Germany
1997: Innsbruck, Austria
1999: Königssee, Germany
2000: St. Moritz, Switzerland
2001: Calgary, Canada
2003: Sigulda, Latvia
2004: Nagano, Japan
2005: Park City, United States
2007: Innsbruck, Austria
2008: Oberhof, Germany
2009: Lake Placid, United States
2011: Cesana, Italy
2012: Altenberg, Germany
2013: Whistler, Canada
2015: Sigulda, Latvia
2016: Königssee, Germany
2017: Innsbruck, Austria
2019: Winterberg, Germany
2020: Sochi, Russia
2021: Königssee, Germany (Originally awarded to Calgary and then to Whistler, Canada)
2022: Winterberg, Germany (only women's doubles)
2023: Oberhof, Germany
2024: Altenberg, Germany
2025: Whistler, Canada

Men's singles
Debuted: 1955.

Medal table

Women's singles
Debuted: 1955.

Medal table

Men's doubles
Debuted: 1955 as open event to men and women. Cancelled due to weather conditions: 1959. Changed to men's doubles: 2023.

Medal table

Women's doubles
Debuted: 2022.

Medal table

Mixed team
Debuted: 1989 as mixed team. Shortened to four members from six: 1999. Changed to relay event: 2008.

Medal table

Men's sprint
Debuted: 2016.

Medal table

Women's sprint
Debuted: 2016.

Medal table

Men's doubles' sprint
Debuted: 2016 as open event to men and women. Changed to men's doubles' sprint: 2023.

Medal table

Women's doubles' sprint
Debuted: 2023.

Medal table

Medal table
Updated after the 2023 FIL World Luge Championships.

Multiple medalists
Boldface denotes active lugers and highest medal count among all lugers (including these who not included in these tables) per type.

Men

Women

References
Overall Winners World Championship
FIL-Luge.org list of World luge champions.  – Accessed 31 January 2008.
"Luge and Olympism". Olympic Review. December 1983. p. 862.
Doubles World Champions
Men's singles World Champions
Mixed teams World Champions
Women's singles World Champions

 
Luge competitions
Recurring sporting events established in 1955
luge
1955 establishments in Norway